Aarti Mukherjee, also known as Aarti Mukherji or Arati Mukhopadhyay, is an Indian playback singer who has sung in Hindi films such as Geet Gata Chal (1975), Tapasya (1976), Manokamana, Masoom (1983) and Sooraj Mukhi (1992).

Early life
Mukherjee was born in Dhaka, Undivided India, to a Bengali family. Her family migrated to West Bengal, India. Her Bengali family had a rich cultural and musical heritage. She was introduced to music by her mother. She studied under Shri Susheel Banerjee, Ustaad Mohammed Sagiruddin Khan, Pandit Chinmoy Lahiri, Pandit Laxman Prasad Jaipurwale and Pandit Ramesh Nadkarni.

Career
In Bangla TV show Dadagiri she reflected on her early days. She stated that she sang on the All India Music Talent Programme in 1955 at age 14 or 15. She was trained in Indian Classical Music from a young age. She sang primarily for Bengali films. She won the music contest, "Metro-Murphy Contest" whose judges were music directors including Anil Biswas, Naushad, Vasant Desai and C. Ramchandra. This enabled her career as a playback singer. She got her first break in 1958 Hindi film Sahara, but the music of that film was limited.

After a string of flops like A Girlfriend, she decided to open herself to Bengali films. She sang for the first time in a Bengali film called Kanya in 1962. Her versatility and voice infatuated audiences so much that they started losing affection for erstwhile leading singer Sandhya Mukherjee and Pratima Banerjee . In the late 1960s, her voice was used as the on-screen voice of leading actress Suchitra Sen.

In 1966, she sang in the film Golpo Holeo Sotyi, which earned her BFJA Award for Best Female Playback Singer. In 1976, she won again for Chhutir Phande. She lent her voice for leading actresses of the late sixties till eighties, such as Madhabi Mukherji, Sharmila Tagore, Aparna Sen, Debashri Roy and Tanuja. She, along with Asha Bhosle, took the leading spot in the 1970s.

She sang 'Bacche ho tum Khel khilone' and in a duet with Kishore Kumar titled 'Do panchi do tinke'. She is said to have sung 15,000 songs in Bengali as well as Hindi songs. She continued success in the 1970s that inspired her to return to Bollywood. In 1983 R. D. Burman, who was the mentor of Bengali singers Kumar Sanu, Abhijeet and Andrew Kishore, gave her "Do Naina Aur Ek Kahani" in the film Masoom voicing Shabana Azmi. The song was a chartbuster and is still sung. It earned her the Filmfare award for best female playback singer in 1983. Her popular repertoire includes 'Radha Banshi Chara Janena', 'Ek Boishakhe Dekha Holo Dujonar', 'Ei Mon Jochonay Ongo Bhijiye', 'Ja Ja Behaya Pakhi Jana', 'Tokhon Tomar Ekush Bochor Bodhoy.' She also has several non-film songs to her credit. She lent her voice to several Hindi compositions as well.

In the year 1957, while still in school, she bagged the first prize in the All-India Murphy Metro Music contest held in Mumbai, having been adjudged the best singer by leading music directors of that time such as Anil Biswas, Naushad Ali, Vasant Desai, C. Ramchandra, and Madan Mohan.

Arati commenced her musical journey in films with Bengali film Subarna Rekha and Hindi film Angulimaal and has, since then, sung thousands of songs in Bengali, Oriya, Manipuri, Assamese, Hindi, Gujarati, Marathi and other languages.

Apart from films, Arati has engaged audiences with albums and live performances on television and stage of Rabindra Sangeet and Nazrul Geeti. Her versatility can be seen in diverse genres of music like Thumri, Bhajan, Tappa, Tarana, and Ghazal. She performed extensively in India and throughout the world.

Recognition 

 Bengal Film Journalists Association Award (1965) for Best Female Singer and earned it repeatedly thereafter
 "Miyan Tansen award" of Sur Singar Samsad for her performance in Geet Gata Chal
 Gujarat State Government Awards for three consecutive years for her Gujarati film songs. 
 Lifetime Achievement Award from the Orissa Government (2015)
 Lifetime Achievement Award from Times of India Group (2016)
 National Film Award for Best Female Playback Singer
 Filmfare Award for Best Female Playback Singer for the song "Do Naina" in Shekhar Kapur's Masoom.
 Bengal Film Journalists' Association – Best Female Playback Award - 1976 for Chhutir Phande
 Bengal Film Journalists' Association – Best Female Playback Award- 1967 for Golpo Holeo Satyi

Filmography

Bengali songs

Film songs

Popular songs 

 "Shyam Teri Bansi Pukare" (with Jaspal Singh - Geet Gaata Chal)
"Do Panchhi Do Tinke"
"Kabhi Kuchch Pal Jeevan Ke"
"Do Naina, Aur Ek Kahani"
"Yadon Ko Bhool Jayen To Kaise Bhool Jayen"
"Nayana Neer Na Bahao"
"Bolo Na Bolo Na Soi"
"Prajapati Sethay Ghore"
"Kon Kule Aaj Bhirlo Tari"
"Swapna Niye"
"Sujyi Alo De"
"Anugatajane Keno Karo Eto"
"Tokhon Tomar Ekush Bosor"
"Ei Mon Jochonay Ongo Vijiye"
"Sara Mora Kajra Churaya Tu Ne" ( with Rafi -Do Dil - 1965)
"Shile Shile Theka Khale"

References

External links

 

Bengali singers
Indian women playback singers
Rabindra Sangeet exponents
Bollywood playback singers
Living people
20th-century Indian women singers
20th-century Indian singers
Singers from West Bengal
Women musicians from West Bengal
20th-century women composers
19th-century women composers
Filmfare Awards winners
1943 births